Tyler Cameron Ennis McIntyre (born August 24, 1994) is a Canadian professional basketball player for Tofaş of the Turkish BSL. He played college basketball for the Syracuse Orange, where he was considered one of the top freshmen in 2013–14. He was drafted 18th overall by the Phoenix Suns in the 2014 NBA draft.

High school career
Ennis attended St. Benedict's Preparatory School in Newark, New Jersey. Prior to heading south to St. Benedict's Prep, Ennis attended Cardinal Newman Catholic Elementary School in Brampton, Ontario and Father Henry Carr Catholic Secondary School in Etobicoke, Ontario. In his junior year in 2011–12, Ennis led St. Benedict's, coached by Mark Taylor, to a school-record 35 victories and the No. 2 ranking in New Jersey. He was named the Gatorade New Jersey Player of the Year while averaging 14.6 points and 7.1 assists per game. In his senior year in 2012–13, the Gray Bees finished with a record of 31-2 as Ennis was honored as the Star-Ledger Prep Player of the Year and earned All-Prep First Team recognition after averaging 20 points, 6.1 assists, 5.2 rebounds and 3.1 steals per game.

Considered a five-star recruit by ESPN.com, Ennis was listed as the No. 5 point guard and the No. 20 player in the nation in 2013.

College career
In his freshman season at Syracuse in 2013–14, Ennis was named to the 2014 All-ACC second team, All-ACC Freshmen Team, and All-ACC Defensive Team. In 34 games, he averaged 12.9 points, 3.4 rebounds, 5.5 assists and 2.1 steals in 35.7 minutes per game.

On February 28, 2014, Ennis was named one of the ten semi-finalists for the Naismith College Player of the Year.

Ennis helped lead the Syracuse Orange past Western Michigan in the second round of the 2014 NCAA Tournament, but missed a three-pointer at the buzzer of the following game that would have taken Syracuse past Dayton and into the Sweet Sixteen.

Professional career

Phoenix Suns (2014–2015)
On June 26, 2014, Ennis was selected with the 18th overall pick in the 2014 NBA draft by the Phoenix Suns. He later joined the Suns for the 2014 NBA Summer League. On August 8, he signed his rookie scale contract with the Suns. He made his NBA debut on October 29 in the Suns' season opener against the Los Angeles Lakers, recording two points, three assists and one block in a 119–99 win. During his rookie season with the Suns, Ennis received multiple assignments to the Bakersfield Jam of the NBA Development League.

Milwaukee Bucks (2015–2016)
On February 19, 2015, Ennis was traded, along with Miles Plumlee, to the Milwaukee Bucks as part of a three-team deal involving the Philadelphia 76ers; as part of the deal, the Bucks also received Michael Carter-Williams from Philadelphia, while Phoenix received Brandon Knight and Kendall Marshall from Milwaukee and Philadelphia received a future first-round pick from Phoenix. The next day, Ennis made his debut for the Bucks, recording four points and two assists off the bench in 89–81 win over the Denver Nuggets.

In May 2015, Ennis underwent surgery to repair a torn labrum in his right shoulder.

On March 17, 2016, Ennis recorded career highs of 13 points and five rebounds in the Bucks' 96–86 win over the Memphis Grizzlies. Nine days later, he recorded nine points and a career-high 12 assists in a 115–91 loss to the Charlotte Hornets.

Houston Rockets (2016–2017)
On September 22, 2016, Ennis was traded to the Houston Rockets in exchange for Michael Beasley.

Los Angeles Lakers (2017–2018)
On February 23, 2017, Ennis was traded, along with the draft rights to Brad Newley, to the Los Angeles Lakers in exchange for Marcelo Huertas. On April 5, 2017, in his first start of the season, Ennis scored a career-high 19 points in place of injured starter D'Angelo Russell to lead the Lakers to a 102–95 win over the San Antonio Spurs. He surpassed that mark four days later, scoring 20 points in a 110–109 win over the Minnesota Timberwolves.

On July 26, 2017, Ennis re-signed with the Lakers. On December 31, 2017, Ennis scored 20 points in a 148–142 double overtime loss to the Houston Rockets. On April 8, 2018, he scored a career-high 22 points in a 112–97 loss to the Utah Jazz. He shot 9 of 18 from the field, made three steals and played 28 minutes off the bench.

On June 28, 2018, Ennis was waived by the Lakers.

Fenerbahçe (2018–2019)
On July 19, 2018, Ennis signed a two-year deal with the Turkish club Fenerbahçe. In his first four games, he averaged 11.8 minutes and 6.7 points per game. Ennis suffered a severe ankle injury in a game on October 21 and was taken to the hospital. His ankle was broken. On July 1, 2019, Ennis was released from the Turkish club.

Raptors 905 (2019–2020)

On October 20, 2019, Ennis, who has spent time with four NBA teams, signed with the Toronto Raptors, and was immediately waived. The moves were designed to make Ennis an affiliate player for the organization’s G League team, Raptors 905. On November 20, he had a double-double of 23 points and 12 assists against the Maine Red Claws. On January 18, 2020, Ennis recorded 25 points, 10 assists, three rebounds and one steal in a 106-103 loss to the Canton Charge. Ennis averaged 17.1 points, 7.4 assists, and 5.4 rebounds per game.

Turk Telecom (2020–2022)
On July 23, 2020, he has signed with Türk Telekom of the Turkish Super League (BSL). Ennis tore his Achilles tendon on November 22, and was ruled out for the season.

Tofaş (2022–present)
On January 9, 2022, Ennis signed with Tofaş of the Turkish BSL.

National team career
Ennis played for the Canadian men's national basketball team at the 2012 FIBA Americas Under-18 Championship, winning a bronze medal, and at the 2013 FIBA Under-19 World Championship, leading the tournament in scoring with 20.9 points per game. In the 2012 tournament, he was a teammate of fellow college standout and eventual #1 pick of the 2014 NBA draft, Andrew Wiggins.

Career statistics

NBA

Regular season

|-
| align="left" | 
| align="left" | Phoenix
| 8 || 0 || 7.3 || .429 || .333 || 1.000 || .9 || 1.8 || .0 || .3 || 2.8
|-
| align="left" | 
| align="left" | Milwaukee
| 25 || 1 || 14.1 || .350 || .270 || .600 || 1.1 || 2.4 || .7 || .1 || 4.0
|-
| align="left" | 
| align="left" | Milwaukee
| 46 || 7 || 14.2 || .449 || .333 || .735 || 1.6 || 2.1 || .5 || .0 || 4.5
|-
| align="left" | 
| align="left" | Houston
| 31 || 0 || 6.3 || .391 || .375 || .667 || .6 || 1.1 || .2 || .0 || 1.9
|-
| align="left" | 
| align="left" | L.A. Lakers
| 22 || 2 || 17.8 || .451 || .389 || .864 || 1.2 || 2.4 || .9 || .1 || 7.7 
|-
| align="left" | 
| align="left" | L.A. Lakers
| 54 || 11 || 12.6 || .420 || .250 || .759 || 1.8 || 1.9 || .6 || .2 || 4.1
|-
| align="center" colspan="2"| Career
| 186 || 21 || 12.6 || .419 || .317 || .768 || 1.3 || 1.9 || .5 || .1 || 4.2

Playoffs

|-
| align="left" | 2015
| align="left" | Milwaukee
| 1 || 0 || 16.0 || .222 || .200 || – || 4.0 || 3.0 || .0 || .0 || 5.0
|-
| align="center" colspan="2"| Career
| 1 || 0 || 16.0 || .222 || .200 || – || 4.0 || 3.0 || .0 || .0 || 5.0

EuroLeague

|-
| align="left" | 2018–19
| align="left" | Fenerbahçe 
| 3 || 0 || 10.2 || .778 || 1.000 || .667 || .7 || 1.0 || .3 || .0 || 6.3 || 6.7
|-
| align="center" colspan="2"| Career
| 3 || 0 || 10.2 || .778 || 1.000 || .667 || .7 || 1.0 || .3 || .0 || 6.3 || 6.7

College

|-
| style="text-align:left;"| 2013–14
| style="text-align:left;"| Syracuse
| 34 || 34 || 35.7 || .411 || .353 || .765 || 3.4 || 5.5 || 2.1 || .2 || 12.9

Personal life
Ennis is the son of Tony McIntyre and Suzette Ennis McIntyre. He has six siblings: Brandon, Dylan, Brittany, Dominique, Tyylon and Bryyson. His father works full-time as Director of Basketball Operations at the Athlete Institute in Orangeville, Ontario and helped create Ontario's CIA Bounce AAU program in 2004. His brother, Dylan, played college basketball for Oregon and Villanova. Ennis' family has Jamaican heritage. Ennis also played lacrosse as a child, where he was teammates with current Montreal Canadiens forward Sean Monahan.

See also

 List of Canadians in the National Basketball Association

References

External links

 Syracuse Orange bio
 EuroLeague profile
 
 

1994 births
Living people
Bakersfield Jam players
Basketball players from Toronto
Black Canadian basketball players
Canadian expatriate basketball people in Turkey
Canadian expatriate basketball people in the United States
Canadian men's basketball players
Canadian sportspeople of Jamaican descent
Amateur Athletic Union men's basketball players
Fenerbahçe men's basketball players
Houston Rockets players
Los Angeles Lakers players
Milwaukee Bucks players
National Basketball Association players from Canada
Parade High School All-Americans (boys' basketball)
Phoenix Suns draft picks
Phoenix Suns players
Point guards
Raptors 905 players
St. Benedict's Preparatory School alumni
Syracuse Orange men's basketball players
Türk Telekom B.K. players